Old Ironsides may refer to:

Nicknames
 Oliver Cromwell (1599–1658), English general, Lord Protector and politician whose nickname was "Old Ironsides" 
 , a 100-gun Royal Navy first rate ship-of-the-line active during the American Revolutionary War and the Napoleonic Wars
 , a 44-gun United States Navy frigate, still in commission
 1st Armored Division, an armored division of the United States Army
 Norman Keith Collins (aka Sailor Jerry), "Old Ironsides" was his nickname on his radio show

Other uses
 "Old Ironsides", an article by James Fenimore Cooper published posthumously in 1853
 Old Ironsides (album), by hip-hop duo Mars ILL
 Old Ironsides (film), a 1926 film directed by James Cruze and starring Wallace Beery
 Old Ironsides (locomotive), the first locomotive built by Matthias W. Baldwin
 "Old Ironsides" (poem), an 1830 poem written by Oliver Wendell Holmes, Sr. as a tribute to the USS Constitution
 Old Ironsides (VTA), a light rail station in Santa Clara California

See also
 USS New Ironsides
 Ironside (disambiguation)